The 2010 Lunar New Year Cup is a football tournament held in Hong Kong on the fourth day of the Chinese New Year of the Tiger (18 January 2010).

Format
The teams play against each other in 45-minute matches like TIM Trophy, but if the matches are goalless the matches are not decided by penalty shoot-outs.

Participating teams
 Kitchee (host)
 Pohang Steelers
 Pegasus Invitation Team

Squads

Kitchee
 Head coach:  Josep Gombau
 Coach:  Cheng Siu Chung
 Executive Officer:  Alex Chu Chi Kwong
 Manager:  Ken Ng

Pohang Steelers
 Head coach:  Waldemar Lemos
 Coach:  Choi Moon-sik
 Interpreter:  Na Young-joon
 Trainer:  An Sung-hoon
 Manager:  Shin Joo-hyun

Pegasus Invitation Team

Fixtures

All times given in Hong Kong Time (UTC+8).

Top scorers
1 goal

References

External links

2009–10 in Hong Kong football
2010
February 2010 sports events in Asia